Murthly railway station served the village of Murthly, Perth and Kinross, Scotland from 1856 to 1965 on the Perth and Dunkeld Railway. The railway line which the station was on is still active, being the Highland Main Line.

History 
The station opened on 7 April 1856 by the Perth and Dunkeld Railway. It closed to both passengers and goods traffic on 3 May 1965.

The station signal box, built in 1898 for the Highland Railway, was relocated from Inverness to Murthly in 1919. It is considered at high risk due to its structural deterioration.

References

External links 

Disused railway stations in Perth and Kinross
Railway stations in Great Britain opened in 1856
Railway stations in Great Britain closed in 1965
Beeching closures in Scotland
1856 establishments in Scotland
1965 disestablishments in Scotland
Former Highland Railway stations